Jean Sabbagh (23 January 1917 – 1 October 2006) was a French contre-amiral and advisor to General Charles de Gaulle.

Life
Jean Charles Sabbagh was born in Paris, the elder son of artist Georges Hanna Sabbagh and art historian and resistance heroine Agnès Humbert.

Jean Sabbagh became an ensign in the French navy in 1939, and in 1940 was on board the gunboat Ville-d'Ys when it was sent by the Vichy government to "protect" Saint Pierre and Miquelon from the British.  He was a lieutenant later that year when the same boat was disarmed at Martinique. He became captain of a corvette in 1953, and was captain of a frigate in 1953. He was first commandant of the frigate Le Provençal from 1958 to 1960. He became advisor to General de Gaulle from 1965-1967, Commandant of the Naval School and the school of Naval pupil-officers from 1967-1969, and contre-amiral in 1971. In 1973 President Pompidou appointed him Alternate Advisor to the Court of State Security. He was head of the division of international relations for the Chief of the Defence Staff from 1973-1975, and senior consultant of foreign commerce in 1975.

With his wife Monique and other members of his family, Jean Sabbagh wrote a retrospective appreciation of the work of his father Georges Hanna Sabbagh, including a catalogue of his paintings and drawings.

In 1986 Jean Sabbagh, with his knowledge of submarines and the war, collaborated in the translation into French of two books by Tom Clancy:  The Hunt for Red October as Octobre rouge, and Red Storm Rising as Tempête rouge.

Family
 
Jean Sabbagh married Monique Le Bidois in April 1941 and they had five children: Yves, Armelle (Mme Henri Sentilhes), Marc, Antoine and Pauline (Mme Pascal Rambaud). Sabbagh's brother was television producer Pierre Sabbagh, and he was the cousin and lifelong friend of architect Jane Drew.

Notes

References
Humbert, Agnès (tr. Barbara Mellor), Résistance: Memoirs of Occupied France, London, Bloomsbury Publishing PLC, 2008  (American title: Resistance: A Frenchwoman's Journal of the War, Bloomsbury, USA, 2008)
Sile Flower, Jean Macfarlane, Ruth Plant, Jane B. Drew, architect: A tribute from her colleagues and friends for her 75th birthday 24 March 1986. Bristol: Bristol Centre for the Advancement of Architecture, 1986.

Bibliography
 Clancy, Tom, Octobre rouge, (tr. of The Hunt for Red October by Marianne Veron, with the collaboration of Jean Sabbagh), Paris, Editions Albin Michel, 1986
 Clancy, Tom, Tempête rouge, (tr. of Red Storm Rising by France-Marie Watkins, with the collaboration of Jean Sabbagh), Paris, Editions Albin Michel, 1987 
 Lescallier, Daniel, Traité pratique de gréement des vaissaux et autres bâtiments de mer, preface by Capt. Jean Sabbagh, 1968
 Jean Sabbagh and Pierre Sabbagh, Georges Sabbagh, Paris, J. Sabbagh, 1981 
 Jean Sabbagh, Monique Sabbagh, Mathilde Sabbagh and Marc Sabbagh, Georges Sabbagh, Peintures-Aquarelles-Dessins (Paintings-Watercolours-Drawings), preface by Monique Sabbagh and Emmanuel Bréon, Paris, Editions du Panama, 2006  includes English translation by Lisa Davidson

External links
 French Naval Officers Biographies
 Jean Sabbagh: biography from Who's Who in France
 Jean Sabbagh, first Commandant of Le Provençal
 Article by Contre-Amiral Jean Sabbagh on clandestine submarine operations off the Var coast in 1943
 Official Journal of the French Republic, 3 August 1973

French Navy admirals
1917 births
2006 deaths